Badam Chaloq (also Romanized as Bādām Chāloq; also known as Badam Chalegh and Bādām Chālūq) is a village in Aq Kahriz Rural District, Nowbaran District, Saveh County, Markazi Province, Iran. As of the 2006 census, its population was 273, in 91 families.

References 

Populated places in Saveh County